This is a list of Hong Kong football transfers for the 2013–14 winter transfer window. Only moves featuring at least one First Division club are listed.

The 2013–14 winter transfer window for Hong Kong football transfers opened on 2 January and closed on 29 January. Additionally, players without a club could join at any time before 29 March.

This list also includes transfers featuring at least one First Division club which were completed after the end of the summer 2013 transfer window and before the end of the 2013–14 winter window.

Transfers

All players and clubs without a flag are Hongkonger.

References

Transfers Winter 2013-14
2013-14
Hong Kong